Catharsius gorilla is a species of  African dung beetles of the family Scarabaeidae. This species is widespread in the tropical African regions (Senegal, Guinea, Nigeria, Chad, Gabon, Democratic Republic of Congo, Tanzania).

References

Biolib
Zipcodezoo Species Identifier
Catalogue of Life

Coprini
Beetles of Africa
Beetles described in 1858